The Banu Ghaniya were a Massufa Sanhaja Berber dynasty and a branch of the Almoravids. Their first leader, Muhammad ibn Ali ibn Yusuf, a son of Ali ibn Yusuf al-Massufi and the Almoravid Princess Ghaniya, was appointed as governor of the Balearic Islands in 1126. Following the collapse of the Almoravid power at the hand of the Almohads in the 1140s, the Banu Ghaniya continued to govern the Balearic Islands as independent emirs until about 1203, with a brief interruption in the 1180s. Later leaders (Ali ibn Ishaq and Yahya) made a determined attempt to reconquer the Maghreb (and in particular Ifriqiya), taking Bougie, Constantine and Algiers, and conquering most of modern Tunisia from about 1180 onwards.

They were influential in the downfall of the Almohad Empire in Eastern Maghrib. In Tunisia Ali ibn Ishaq adhered to the Abbasid Caliphate and was formally appointed by Al-Mustadi with the title of "heir of the Almoravids".

Emirs

Muhammad ibn Ali ibn Yusuf 1126–1165 (deposed)
Ishaq ibn Muhammad (son) 1165–1183
Muhammad ibn Ishaq (son) 1183–1184
To Almohad 1184
Ali ibn Ishaq (known as Ali ibn Ghaniya) 1184–1188, emir (by conquest) of Bougie (1185–1186) Algiers (1186) and Gafsa (1186–1187), warlord in Tunis 1187–1188
Tashfin ibn Ishaq, emir of Majorca (in opposition to 'Ali) 1185–1187
'Abdallah ibn Ishaq (known as 'Abdallah ibn Ghaniya), emir of Majorca 1187–1203
Yahya ibn Ishaq (known as Yahya ibn Ghaniya) 1188–1202/1203 warlord in Tunis 1188–1212

References

Bibliography 

 
 
 

 
Oriental islands of Al-Andalus
Berber dynasties